Constantin Brâncuși (February 19, 1876 – March 16, 1957) was a Romanian sculptor, painter and photographer who made his career in France.  Considered one of the most influential sculptors of the 20th-century and a pioneer of modernism, Brâncuși is called the patriarch of modern sculpture. As a child he displayed an aptitude for carving wooden farm tools. Formal studies took him first to Bucharest, then to Munich, then to the École des Beaux-Arts in Paris from 1905 to 1907. His art emphasizes clean geometrical lines that balance forms inherent in his materials with the symbolic allusions of representational art. Brâncuși sought inspiration in non-European cultures as a source of primitive exoticism, as did Paul Gauguin, Pablo Picasso, André Derain and others. However, other influences emerge from Romanian folk art traceable through Byzantine and Dionysian traditions.

Early years

Brâncuși grew up in the village of Hobița, Gorj, near Târgu Jiu, close to Romania's Carpathian Mountains, an area known for its rich tradition of folk crafts, particularly woodcarving. Geometric patterns of the region are seen in his later works such as the Endless Column created in 1918.

His parents Nicolae and Maria Brâncuși were poor peasants who earned a meagre living through back-breaking labor; from the age of seven, Constantin herded the family's flock of sheep. He showed talent for carving objects out of wood and often ran away from home to escape the bullying of his father and older brothers.

At the age of nine, Brâncuși left the village to work in the nearest large town.  At the age of eleven, he went into the service of a grocer in Slatina; and then he became a domestic in a public house in Craiova, where he remained for several years. When he was 18, Brâncuși created a violin by hand with materials he found around his workplace. Impressed by Brâncuși's talent for carving, an industrialist enrolled him in the Craiova School of Arts and Crafts (școala de arte și meserii), where he pursued his love for woodworking, graduating with honors in 1898.

He then enrolled in the Bucharest School of Fine Arts, where he received academic training in sculpture. He worked hard and quickly distinguished himself as talented. One of his earliest surviving works, under the guidance of his anatomy teacher, Dimitrie Gerota, is a masterfully rendered écorché (statue of a man with skin removed to reveal the muscles underneath) which was exhibited at the Romanian Athenaeum in 1903. Though just an anatomical study, it foreshadowed the sculptor's later efforts to reveal essence rather than merely copy outward appearance.

Working in Paris

In 1903, Brâncuși traveled to Munich, and from there to Paris. In Paris, he was welcomed by the community of artists and intellectuals brimming with new ideas. He worked for two years in the workshop of Antonin Mercié of the École des Beaux-Arts, and was invited to enter the workshop of Auguste Rodin. Even though he admired the eminent Rodin he left the Rodin studio after only two months, saying, "Nothing can grow under big trees."

After leaving Rodin's workshop, Brâncuși began developing the revolutionary style for which he is known. His first commissioned work, The Prayer, was part of a gravestone memorial. It depicts a young woman crossing herself as she kneels, and marks the first step toward abstracted, non-literal representation, and shows his drive to depict "not the outer form but the idea, the essence of things." He also began doing more carving, rather than the method popular with his contemporaries, that of modeling in clay or plaster which would be cast in metal, and by 1908 he worked almost exclusively by carving.

In the following few years he made many versions of Sleeping Muse and The Kiss, further simplifying forms to geometrical and sparse objects.

His works became popular in France, Romania, and the United States. Collectors, notably John Quinn, bought his pieces, and reviewers praised his works. In 1913 Brâncuși's work was displayed at both the Salon des Indépendants and the first exhibition in the U.S. of modern art, the Armory Show.

In 1920, he developed a notorious reputation with the entry of Princess X in the Salon. The phallic appearance of this large, gleaming bronze piece scandalized the Salon and, despite Brâncuși's explanation that it was simply meant to represent the essence of womanhood, it was removed from the exhibition. Princess X was revealed to be Princess Marie Bonaparte, direct descendant of the younger brother of Napoleon Bonaparte. The sculpture has been interpreted by some as symbolizing her obsession with the penis and her lifelong quest to achieve vaginal orgasm, with the help of Sigmund Freud.

Around this time Brâncuși began crafting the bases for his sculptures with much care and originality because he considered them important to the works themselves.

One of his major groups of sculptures involved the Bird in Space — simple abstract shapes representing a bird in flight. The works are based on his earlier Măiastra series. In Romanian folklore the Măiastra is a beautiful golden bird who foretells the future and cures the blind. Over the following 20 years, Brâncuși made multiple versions of Bird in Space out of marble or bronze. Athena Tacha Spear's book, Brâncuși's Birds, (CAA monographs XXI, NYU Press, New York, 1969), first sorted out the 36 versions and their development, from the early Măiastra, to the Golden Bird of the late teens, to the Bird in Space, which emerged in the early 1920s and which Brâncuși developed throughout his life.

One of these versions caused a major controversy in 1926 when photographer Edward Steichen purchased it and shipped it to the United States. Customs officers did not accept the Bird as a work of art and assessed customs duty on its import as an industrial item. After protracted court proceedings, this assessment was overturned, thus confirming the Bird's status as a duty-exempt work of art. The verdict was somewhat influenced by the Judge Justice Waite's personal appreciation of the art calling it 'beautiful', 'symmetrical', and 'ornamental'. The ruling also established the important principle that "art" does not have to involve a realistic representation of nature, and that it was legitimate for it to simply represent an abstract concept – in this case "flight".

His work became increasingly popular in the U.S, where he visited several times during his life. Worldwide fame in 1933 brought him the commission of building a meditation temple, the Temple of Deliverance, in India for the Maharajah of Indore, Yeshwant Rao Holkar. Holkar had commissioned three "L'Oiseau dans l'Espace"—in bronze, black and white marble—previously, but when Brâncuși went to India in 1937 to complete the plans and begin construction, the Mahrajah was away and, supposedly, lost interest in the project which was to be an homage to his wife, the Maharani Margaret Holkar, who had died when he returned. Of the three birds, the bronze one is in the collection of the Norton Simon Museum in Pasadena, California, and the two marble birds are currently in the permanent collection of the National Gallery of Australia  in Canberra, Australia.

In 1938, he finished the World War I monument in Târgu-Jiu where he had spent much of his childhood. Table of Silence, The Gate of the Kiss, and Endless Column commemorate the courage and sacrifice of Romanians who in 1916 defended Târgu Jiu from the forces of the Central Powers. The restoration of this ensemble was spearheaded by the World Monuments Fund and was completed in 2004.

The Târgu Jiu ensemble marks the apex of his artistic career. In his remaining 19 years he created fewer than 15 pieces, mostly reworking earlier themes, and while his fame grew he withdrew. Brâncuși received his first retrospective in 1955 at the Guggenheim Museum in New York. In 1955 Life magazine reported, "Wearing white pajamas and a yellow gnome-like cap, Brâncuși today hobbles about his studio tenderly caring for and communing with the silent host of fish, birds, heads, and endless columns which he created."

Brâncuși was cared for in his later years by a Romanian refugee couple. He became a French citizen in 1952 in order to make the caregivers his heirs, and to bequeath his studio and its contents to the Musée National d'Art Moderne in Paris. In 2021, for IRCAM and Centre Pompidou's Festival Manifeste, the intermedial large-scale installation Infinite Light Columns / Constellations of The Future, tribute to Constantin Brancusi by artists duo Arotin And Serghei has been installed on Renzo Piano's IRCAM Tower on Centre Pompidou Square, on the opposite site to Brancusi's Studio.

Personal life

Brâncuși dressed simply, reflective of his Romanian peasant background. His studio was reminiscent of the houses of the peasants from his native region: there was a big slab of rock as a table and a primitive fireplace, similar to those found in traditional houses in his native Oltenia, while the rest of the furniture was made by him out of wood. Brâncuși would cook his own food, traditional Romanian dishes, with which he would treat his guests.

Brâncuși held a large spectrum of interests, from science to music, and was known to play the violin. He would sing old Romanian folk songs, often expressing his feelings of homesickness. After the installment of communism, the artist never permanently returned to his native Romania, but did visit eight times.

His circle of friends included artists and intellectuals in Paris such as Amedeo Modigliani, Ezra Pound, Henri Pierre Roché, Guillaume Apollinaire, Louise Bourgeois, Pablo Picasso, Man Ray, Marcel Duchamp, Henri Rousseau, Peggy Guggenheim, Tristan Tzara and Fernand Léger. He was an old friend of Romany Marie, who was also Romanian, and referred Isamu Noguchi to her café in Greenwich Village.
Although surrounded by the Parisian avant-garde, Brâncuși never lost contact with Romania and had friends from the community of Romanian artists and intellectuals living in Paris, including Benjamin Fondane, George Enescu, Theodor Pallady, Camil Ressu, Nicolae Dărăscu, Panait Istrati, Traian Vuia, Eugène Ionesco, Emil Cioran, Natalia Dumitresco and Paul Celan. Another Romanian scholar wrote on Brancusi, Mircea Eliade.

Brâncuși held a particular interest in mythology, especially Romanian mythology, folk tales, and traditional art (which also had a strong influence on his works), but he became interested in African and Mediterranean art as well.

A talented handyman, he built his own phonograph and made most of his furniture, utensils, and doorways. His worldview valued "differentiating the essential from the ephemeral," with Plato, Lao-Tzu, and Milarepa as influences. Reportedly, he had a copy of the first ever translation from the Tibetan into French of Jacques Bacot's Le poete tibetain Milarepa: ses crimes, ses épreuves, son Nirvana  that he kept by his bedside. He identified closely with Milarepa's mountain existence since Brancusi himself came from the Carpathian Mountains of Romania and he often thought he was a reincarnation of Milarepa. He was a saint-like  idealist and near ascetic, turning his workshop into a place where visitors noted the deep spiritual atmosphere. However, particularly through the 1910s and 1920s, he was known as a pleasure seeker and merrymaker in his bohemian circle. He enjoyed cigarettes, good wine, and the company of women. He had one child, John Moore, with the New Zealand pianist Vera Moore, whom he never acknowledged.

Death and legacy

Brâncuși died on March 16, 1957, aged 81. He was buried in the Cimetière du Montparnasse in Paris. This cemetery also displays statues that Brâncuși carved for deceased artists.

In 1962, Georg Olden used Brâncuși's Bird in Space as the inspiration behind his design of the Clio Award statuette.

At his death Brâncuși left 1200 photographs and 215 sculptures. He bequeathed part of his collection to the French state on condition that his workshop be rebuilt as it was on the day he died. This reconstruction of his studio, adjacent to the Pompidou Centre, is open to the public. Brâncuși's studio inspired Swedish architect Klas Anshelm's design of the Malmö Konsthall, which opened in 1975.

Brâncuși was elected posthumously to the Romanian Academy in 1990.

Google commemorated his 135th birthday with a Doodle in 2011 consisting of seven of his works.

Brâncuși's works are housed in the National Museum of Art of Romania (Bucharest), the Museum of Modern Art (New York City) and other museums around the world. The Philadelphia Museum of Art holds the largest collection of Brâncuși sculptures in the United States.

In 2015 the Romanian Parliament declared February 19 "The Brâncuși Day", a working holiday in Romania.

A metro station in Bucharest is named after Brâncuși.

Director Mick Davis plans to make a biographical film about Brâncuși called The Sculptor, and British director Peter Greenaway said in 2017 that he is working on a film called Walking to Paris, a film which shows Brâncuși's journey from Bucharest to Paris.

Art market
Brâncuși's piece Madame L.R. sold for €29.185 million ($37.2 million) in 2009, setting a record price for a sculpture sold at auction.

In May 2018, La Jeune Fille Sophistiquée (Portrait de Nancy Cunard), a polished bronze on a carved marble base (1932), sold for US$71 million (with fees) at Christie's New York, setting a world record auction price for the artist.

Brâncuși on his own work

Selected works
Both Bird in Space and Sleeping Muse I are sculptures of animate objects; however, unlike ones from Ancient Greece or Rome, or those from the High Renaissance period, these works of art are more abstract in style.

Bird in Space is a series from the 1920s. One of these, constructed in 1925 using wood, stone, and marble (Richler 178) stands around 72 inches tall and consists of a narrow feather standing erect on a wooden base. Similar models, but made from materials such as bronze, were also produced by Brâncuși and placed in exhibitions.

Sleeping Muse I has different versions as well; one, from 1909 to 1910, is made of marble and measures 6 ¾ in. in height (Adams 549). This is a model of a head, without a body, with markings to show features such as hair, nose, lips, and closed eyes. In A History of Western Art, Adams says that the sculpture has "an abstract, curvilinear quality and a smooth contour that create an impression of elegance" (549). The qualities which produce the effect can particularly be seen in the shape of the eyes and in the set of the mouth.

Other works

 Bust of a boy (1906)
 The Prayer (1907)
 La Sagesse de la Terre (1908)
 Sleeping Muse (1910), Metropolitan Museum of Art
 Prometheus (1911)
 Mademoiselle Pogany (1912), Philadelphia Museum of Art
 Miss Pogany (1913,) drawing, the Botarro Collection
 The Kiss (1916), Philadelphia Museum of Art
 Princess X (1916),
 Madame L.R. (1914–1918)
 A Muse (1917)
 Chimera (1918)
 Eileen Lane (1922), the Botarro Collection
 Bird in Space (1924), Philadelphia Museum of Art
 Portrait of Nancy Cunard (also called Sophisticated Young Lady) (1925–1927)
 Le Poisson (1926)
 Portrait of James Joyce, for Tales Told of Shem and Shaun (Black Sun Press, Paris, 1929)
 Le Coq (1935)
 Sculptural Ensemble of Constantin Brâncuși at Târgu Jiu (Endless Column) (1935)
 Blonde Negress I (1926), Toledo Museum of Art
 White Negress II (1928), Art Institute of Chicago

In fiction
 Robert McAlmon's 1925 collection of short stories Distinguished Air includes one that revolves around an exhibition of Princess X. In 1930 the watercolour painter Charles Demuth painted Distinguished Air, based on this story.
In Evelyn Waugh's 1945 novel Brideshead Revisited, Anthony Blanche remarks in relating a story to Charles Ryder that "I have two sculptures by Brancusi and several pretty things" [sic].
In the 1988 movie Short Circuit 2, a man walking through an outdoor exhibition speculates that the stationary Johnny 5 robot, who is also admiring the exhibit, is "an early Brâncuși."
In the 1999 science fiction series Total Recall 2070, one episode ("Astral Projections") featured an artifact called the "Brancusi Stone" because it looks like one of Brâncuși's sculptures.
In the 2000 film Mission to Mars, the "Face on Mars" is modeled after Brâncuși's Sleeping Muse.

References

Bibliography
Tom Sandqvist, Dada East – The Romanians of Cabaret Voltaire, MIT Press, 2006, 
Adams, Laura S. A History of Western Art. 4th ed. New York: McGraw–Hill, 2005.
Cristea, Simion Doru. "O escultor Constantin Brâncusi e a consistência paremiológica da sua arte / The Sculptor Constantin Brâncusi and the Paremiological Consistence of His Art." Proceedings of the Twelfth Interdisciplinary Colloquium on Proverbs, November 4 to 11, 2018, at Tavira, Portugal. Eds. Rui J.B. Soares and Outi Lauhakangas. Tavira: Tipografia Tavirense, 2019. 252-282. With 7 illustrations.*Richler, Martha. National Gallery of Art, Washington: A World of Art. London: Scala Books, 1998.
Neutres, Jerome. Brâncuși New York, 1913-2013. New York: Editions Assouline, 2014. 
Varia, Radu. Brancusi. New York: Rizzoli, 1986.

External links

Support for the inclusion of "Heroes' Way", the most prominent monumental ensemble in the region as well as one of Brâncusi's major creations, in the list of UNESCO World Heritage Sites
An excerpt from the transcript of Brâncuși versus United States
Brâncuși in the Philadelphia Museum of Art
Brâncuși in the Guggenheim Museum.

Peggy Guggenheim Collection
Public domain image resources

Brâncuși's atelier at Centre Pompidou, France
Petre Țuțea – An encounter with Brâncuși a rare meeting between two unusual personalities
 

Modern sculptors
01
1876 births
1957 deaths
20th-century French male artists
20th-century French sculptors
20th-century photographers
20th-century Romanian male artists
20th-century Romanian painters
20th-century Romanian photographers
20th-century Romanian sculptors
Burials at Montparnasse Cemetery
French male sculptors
French photographers
Members of the Romanian Academy elected posthumously
People from Gorj County
Romanian avant-garde
Romanian emigrants to France
Romanian photographers
School of Paris
Serial art